Xinhua Square Station is an interchange station on Line 1 & Line 2 of the Hohhot Metro. It opened on 29 December 2019.

References

Hohhot Metro stations
Railway stations in China opened in 2019